IDG or IdG may refer to:

Organisations
 IDG Ventures, a family of venture funds originally funded by International Data Group
 Apple Industrial Design Group, part of Apple Inc.
 Indigo Books and Music, a Canadian retail bookstore chain
 Industrial Development Group, a South African mining company headed by Makaziwe Mandela
 International Deployment Group, a department of the Australian Federal Police
 International Data Group, an American technology, media, research, event management, and venture capital organization.

Other
 Integrated Drive Generator, an aircraft electrical generation unit 
 Indo-Germanic
 The IATA code for Ida Grove Municipal Airport, an airport in Iowa, USA
 Infinite derivative gravity, a theory of modified gravity